Krista Tippett (née Weedman; born November 9, 1960) is an American journalist, author, and entrepreneur. She created and hosts the public radio program and podcast On Being. In 2014, Tippett was awarded the National Humanities Medal by U.S. President Barack Obama.

Career

Study and work abroad
After graduating from Brown in 1983, Tippett was awarded a Fulbright scholarship to study at University of Bonn in West Germany. There she worked in The New York Times bureau in Bonn. She wrote about her experiences in Rostock in "They Just Say 'Over There'" published by Die Zeit. In 1984, she became a stringer for The New York Times in divided Berlin, where she established herself as a freelance foreign correspondent.  She reported and wrote for The Times, Newsweek, the BBC, the International Herald Tribune, and Die Zeit.

In 1986, Tippett became a special political assistant to the senior United States diplomat in West Berlin, John C. Kornblum. The next year she became chief aide in Berlin to the U.S. ambassador to West Germany, Richard Burt. She has written that moral questions arising from that experience of seeing "high power, up close" eventually led to the spiritual, philosophical, and theological curiosities that have defined her work since.

Radio and non-profit media
Tippett received a Masters of Divinity from Yale University in 1994. While conducting a global oral-history project for the Collegeville Institute for Ecumenical and Cultural Research at St. John's Abbey of Collegeville, Minnesota, she developed the idea for her radio show.

Tippett proposed a show about religion to Minnesota Public Radio in the late 1990s. The radio program became a monthly series in 2001 and a weekly national program distributed by American Public Media in 2003. In 2013, Tippett left American Public Media to co-found the non-profit production company, Krista Tippett Public Productions, which she described as "a social enterprise with a radio show at its heart". Tippett is also the co-creator and convener of The Civil Conversations Project, which she has described as "an emergent approach to healing our fractured civic spaces".

Interview style
"The Tippett style", as described by the New York Times, "represents a fusion of all her parts – the child of small-town church comfortable in the pews; the product of Yale Divinity School able to parse text in Greek and theology in German; and, perhaps most of all, the diplomat seeking to resolve social divisions."

Awards

In July 2014, Tippett was awarded the 2013 National Humanities Medal at the White House for "thoughtfully delving into the mysteries of human existence." She received a George Foster Peabody Award in 2008, for "The Ecstatic Faith of Rumi", and three Webby awards for excellence in electronic media. Her book, Einstein's God (2010), was a New York Times bestseller.

Personal life 
Tippett grew up in Shawnee, Oklahoma. She studied History at Brown University, and spent a year in Bonn, West Germany in 1983 on a Fulbright Scholarship.  She has two children and is divorced.

Quotations
 "Anger is often what pain looks like when it shows itself in public."
 "I can disagree with your opinion, it turns out," she says, "but I can't disagree with your experience."

Works
 Speaking of Faith: Why Religion Matters—and How to Talk About It (Penguin, January 29, 2008)
 Einstein's God: Conversations About Science and the Human Spirit (Penguin, February 23, 2010)
 On Being (radio program and podcast, formerly Speaking of Faith)
 Becoming Wise: An Inquiry into the Mystery and Art of Living (Penguin, April 5, 2016)

See also 

 Religion and spirituality podcast

References

Further reading 
 Einstein’s God: Krista Tippett and Theoretical Cosmologist Janna Levin on Free Will, Science, and the Human Spirit Brain Pickings (January 9, 2015)
 What Everybody Needs Brain Pickings (January 9, 2015)
 "On Being" Host Krista Tippett's Tools For Dealing With Difficult Colleagues Fast Company (April 24, 2012)
 The Search for Meaning Brown Alumni Magazine (November/December, 2014)
 The Wisdom Seeker Cake & Whiskey (November, 2014)
 The Public Listener: A Conversation with Radio Host Krista Tippett Christianity Today (August 2, 2013)

Additional works 
 "Berlin by Night" New York Times (May 10, 1987)
 "Weimar's Poets in Residence" New York Times (March 31, 1985)
 Keynote Address, Political Dialogue and Civility in an Age of Polarization, Harvard Negotiation and Mediation Clinical Program (March 25, 2014)
 Gaggy's Blessing on The Moth Radio Hour (February 18, 2014)
 Krista Tippett & Andrew Solomon: Einstein's God: Conversations about Science, Live from the New York Public Library (March 3, 2010)
 Krista Tippett: Reconnecting with Compassion video on TED.com (November, 2010)
 For Play: Krista Tippett & Stuart Brown in conversation with Paul Holdengräber at LIVE from the New York Public Library (January 29, 2008)
 "Krista Tippett", guest on Everyone's Agnostic Podcast Episode 70, Oct. 19, 2015. Cass Midgley and Bob Pondillo.

External links

 Official website
 

1960 births
Living people
People from Shawnee, Oklahoma
American women radio journalists
American radio producers
Brown University alumni
American radio journalists
Yale Divinity School alumni
American talk radio hosts
American women radio presenters
Webby Award winners
Peabody Award winners
National Humanities Medal recipients
21st-century American women
Women radio producers